Waterworks Museum may refer to:

 Metropolitan Waterworks Museum in Boston, Massachusetts
 Waterworks Museum (Cape Town), in South Africa
 Water Supply Museum, in Thessaloniki, Greece
 Louisville WaterWorks Museum, in Kentucky